Ben Ross (born 21 September 1988) is an Australian rules footballer who played for the North Melbourne Football Club and the Hawthorn Football Club in the Australian Football League.

North Melbourne
Ross was selected by the Kangaroos with Pick 3 in the 2006 AFL Pre-Season Draft. 
Ross initially broke into the senior team for the Round 4 win against Melbourne in 2007. He continued to play in other games during the season to pick up a career high 21 possessions and a goal against Port Adelaide, before his year was cut short by injury. He played 9 out of 19 games in 2009.

Ross was delisted by North Melbourne at the end of 2011 after playing 14 games over four injury-interrupted seasons.

Werribee
He continued to play for Werribee in the Victorian Football League (VFL), winning the 2012 J. J. Liston Trophy as the best player in the league. He had a delayed start to the 2013 season because he went overseas for travel purposes hence he missed most of the pre-season training.

Hawthorn

He was selected by Hawthorn in the 2013 Rookie Draft. Ross will provide the Hawks with an immediate source of midfield depth, he is also capable of playing at half-forward or half-back.
He was picked to make his debut for the Hawks against  in Round 13, 2014 after being elevated off the rookie list because of long-term injury to Jed Anderson.

Ross, along with Jordan Kelly and Derick Wanganeen were delisted by Hawthorn on 9 October 2014.

Personal life
Ross is the grandson of Max Papley, a star player with Moorabbin, South Melbourne and Williamstown in the 1960s and 1970s. His brother, Michael Ross, was a midfielder at Essendon and his cousin, Tom Papley, currently plays for the Sydney Swans.

Statistics

|- style=background:#EAEAEA
| 2007 ||  || 33
| 0 || — || — || — || — || — || — || — || — || — || — || — || — || — || — || 0
|-
| 2008 ||  || 15
| 3 || 2 || 2 || 24 || 12 || 36 || 8 || 5 || 0.7 || 0.7 || 8.0 || 4.0 || 12.0 || 2.7 || 1.7 || 0
|- style=background:#EAEAEA
| 2009 ||  || 15
| 9 || 2 || 7 || 80 || 75 || 155 || 31 || 28 || 0.2 || 0.8 || 8.9 || 8.3 || 17.2 || 3.4 || 3.1 || 0
|-
| 2010 ||  || 15
| 2 || 0 || 0 || 11 || 15 || 26 || 7 || 3 || 0.0 || 0.0 || 5.5 || 7.5 || 13.0 || 3.5 || 1.5 || 0
|- style=background:#EAEAEA
| 2011 ||  || 15
| 0 || — || — || — || — || — || — || — || — || — || — || — || — || — || — || 0
|-
| 2014 ||  || 21
| 4 || 1 || 0 || 17 || 13 || 30 || 8 || 3 || 0.3 || 0.0 || 4.3 || 3.3 || 7.5 || 2.0 || 0.8 || 0
|- class="sortbottom"
! colspan=3| Career
! 18 !! 5 !! 9 !! 132 !! 115 !! 247 !! 54 !! 39 !! 0.3 !! 0.5 !! 7.3 !! 6.4 !! 13.7 !! 3.0 !! 2.2 !! 0
|}

Honours and achievements
Individual
 J.J. Liston Trophy: 2012

References

External links

1988 births
Living people
North Melbourne Football Club players
Hawthorn Football Club players
Werribee Football Club players
Box Hill Football Club players
Gippsland Power players
J. J. Liston Trophy winners
Australian rules footballers from Victoria (Australia)